Bathyliotina schepmani, is a species of sea snail, a marine gastropod mollusk in the family Liotiidae.

Distribution
This marine species occurs off the Korea Strait and northeastern Borneo.

References

 McLean, J. H. 1988. Two New Species of Liotiinae (Gastropoda: Turbinidae) from the Philippine Islands. Veliger 30(4): 408–411
 Higo, S., Callomon, P. & Goto, Y. (1999). Catalogue and bibliography of the marine shell-bearing Mollusca of Japan. Osaka. : Elle Scientific Publications. 749 pp.

schepmani
Gastropods described in 1953